Oncideres boliviana is a species of beetle in the family Cerambycidae. It was described by Leopold Heyrovský in 1952. It is known from Bolivia.

References

boliviana
Beetles described in 1952